For articles on Irish television in the 1960s please see:
1960 in Irish television
1961 in Irish television
1962 in Irish television
1963 in Irish television
1964 in Irish television
1965 in Irish television
1966 in Irish television
1967 in Irish television
1968 in Irish television
1969 in Irish television

 
Television in Ireland